The gooseneck is the swivel connection on a sailboat by which the boom attaches to the mast. The boom pivots from side to side and up and down by swiveling on the gooseneck.

The gooseneck may be a two axis swivel as pictured.  Having an integrated shackle for the tack is common. Goosenecks on older rigs may be formed by a loop attached to the end of the boom that fits loosely about the mast.

Sailing rigs and rigging